Eunapius (fl. 4th–5th century AD) was a Greek sophist, rhetorician and historian from Sardis in the region of Lydia in Asia Minor of the fourth century AD. His principal surviving work is the Lives of Philosophers and Sophists, a collection of the biographies of 23 philosophers and sophists. The exact date of his death is unknown but speculated sometime after 414 AD during the reign of Theodosius II

Life
He was born at Sardis, AD 347. In his native city he studied under his relative, the sophist Chrysanthius, and while still a youth went to Athens, where he became a favourite pupil of Prohaeresius the rhetorician. He possessed considerable knowledge of medicine.

In his later years he seems to have lived at Athens, teaching rhetoric. He was initiated into the Eleusinian Mysteries by the last Hierophant, Nestorius.  There is evidence that he was still living in the reign of the younger Theodosius.

Writing
Eunapius was the author of two works, one entitled Lives of Philosophers and Sophists, and Universal History consisting of a continuation of the history of Dexippus. The former work is still extant; of the latter only the Constantinian excerpts remain, but the facts are largely incorporated in the work of Zosimus. It embraced the history of events from AD 270–404.

The Lives of Philosophers and Sophists, a collection of the biographies of 23 older and contemporary philosophers and sophists, is valuable as the only source for the history of the Neoplatonism of that period. The style of both works is marked by a spirit of bitter hostility to Christianity. Photius had before him a "new edition" of the history in which the passages most offensive to Christians were omitted.

The Lives of Philosophers and Sophists consists of the biographies of the following philosophers and sophists: Plotinus, Porphyry, Iamblichus, Alypius, Sosipatra, Aedesius the Cappadocian, Sopater, Ablabius, Eustathius, Maximus, Priscus, Julian of Cappadocia, Prohaeresius, Epiphanius, Diophantus the Arab, Sopolis, Himerius, Parnacius, Libanius, Acacius, Nymphidianus, Zeno of Cyprus, Magnus, Oribasius, Ionicus and Chrysanthius.

Editions and translations
Edition of the Lives by JF Boissonade (1822), with notes by D Wyttenbach
History fragments in Karl Wilhelm Ludwig Müller, Fragmenta Historicorum Graecorum, iv.
V. Cousin, Fragments philosophiques (1865), translation: W. C. Wright in the Loeb Classical Library edition of Philostratus's Lives of the Sophists (1921).
Philostratus, Lives of the Sophists. Eunapius, Lives of the Philosophers and Sophists. Translated by Wilmer C. Wright. 1921. Loeb Classical Library.

References

Bibliography

External links
 1568 editio princeps of the Vitae sophistarum (Greek text with preceding Latin translation)
 English translation of the Lives of the Philosophers and Sophists and Introduction by Wilmer Cave Wright (translator) from the Tertullian Project.
 Greek Opera Omnia by Migne Patrologia Graeca with Analytical Indexes
 Βίοι Φιλοσόφων καὶ Σοφιστῶν (original text in Greek)
 Philostratorum et Callistrati opera, Eunapii vitae sophistarum, Himerii sophistae declamationes, A. Westermann, Jo. Fr. Boissoade, Fr. Dübner (ed.), Parisiis, editore Ambrosio Firmin Didot, 1849, pp. 453-505.

Roman-era Greek priests
4th-century Greek writers
Roman-era students in Athens
Historians from Roman Anatolia
Lydia
Ancient Greek biographers
Biographers of ancient people
Late-Roman-era pagans
Greek-language historians from the Roman Empire
4th-century Byzantine historians
5th-century Byzantine historians
4th-century clergy
5th-century clergy